Roland Bättig (born 28 July 1979, in Switzerland) is a former Swiss professional footballer who last played as a midfielder for FC Thun in the Swiss Super League.

External links
 

1979 births
Living people
Swiss men's footballers
Swiss expatriate footballers
Swiss expatriate sportspeople in Italy
Swiss Super League players
SC Kriens players
Neuchâtel Xamax FCS players
FC Aarau players
FC Luzern players
AC Bellinzona players
Como 1907 players
FC Thun players
Expatriate footballers in Italy
Association football midfielders